Nemophora raddaella is a moth of the Adelidae family that is found in southern Europe.

The larvae feed on Dipsacus species and Scabiosa maritima.

References

External links
Lepiforum.de
Species info at nkis.info

Moths described in 1793
Adelidae
Moths of Europe
Moths of Asia